VEF Rīga is a Latvian professional basketball team that is based in Riga, Latvia. VEF Rīga is a nine-time Latvian Basketball League champion.

History

Early years
The club name VEF came from the radio manufacturing company VEF which created the basketball club in 1958. VEF Rīga has been home to some of the best Latvian players for over five decades. In the beginning with legendary Alfrēds Krauklis as head coach and players like Cezars Ozers, Oļģerts Jurgensons, Bruno Drake, Juris Kalnins, Edmunds Dobelis, Juris Merksons, Visvaldis Eglitis and others, VEF soon started to compete in the Soviet Union League. Back in those days, Latvia was a reference in Soviet and European basketball, as ASK Rīga was the best team in the continent, winning three consecutive European Cup titles from 1958 and 1960 with stars like Jānis Krūmiņš, Maigonis Valdmanis and head coach Aleksander Gomelskiy. ASK's tremendous success overshadowed VEF's achievements, such as finishing third in the very competitive USSR championship in 1960. VEF's star player Cezars Ozers made it to the Soviet Union national team that reached the Olympics title game against the United States in Rome 1960.

VEF Rīga confirmed its status as a Soviet Union League regular, keeping its name in the first division and becoming a hard-to-beat team at any level. However, the lack of a second continental club competition prevented VEF from proving its value against European teams. VEF had its first golden age throughout the 1960s, with Merksons, Kalnins, Jurgensons Ozers, Eglitis and Drake as its core players. A major addition had taken place, too, as Krumins, the most dominant player in Europe for many years, decided to finish his legendary career at VEF, joining the club in 1964. Olgerts Altbergs replaced Krauklis as head coach and had a sudden impact, helping VEF to finish fourth in 1965. Kalnins won a silver Olympic medal with the Soviet Union in 1964, becoming the second VEF player to do so. The team did even better in 1966, finishing third in its domestic competition for the second time in club history. In 1969 team went down to the second division of Soviet league and it took some time to rebuild as the team got back into the Soviet Union elite in 1977 led by legendary player Valdis Valters.

Valters was a true superstar, the starting point guard in the Soviet Union national team that won the 1982 World Championships and lifted the EuroBasket trophy in 1981 (Valters was named tournament MVP) as well as in 1985. Valters was also part of a team that reached Eurobasket title games in 1983 and 1987. Valters left the national team when Sarunas Marciulionis took over, but still played for the VEF until 1990.

In later years, Valters got some help as VEF added young talents like Igors Miglinieks, Gundars Vētra, Raimonds Miglinieks, Kārlis Muižnieks and Ainars Bagatskis. With arguably its best roster ever VEF was fifth in the Soviet Union League in 1985 and ranked sixth in 1987 and 1988.  Vētra and Miglinieks led VEF to finish third in the 1991 Soviet Union League, a historical season in which the club made its debut in European club competitions. VEF downed ICED Bucuresti but fell against Iraklis in the 1991 Korac Cup second preliminary round. VEF went one step higher in 1992, playing in the Saporta Cup. The club knocked off Braunschweig but VEF registered two narrow losses against Union Olimpija in the next round to step down before the group stage. Despite its good season, VEF stopped to exist in 1992.

Re-foundation
The club was re-founded in 2007 with Valdis Valters as the head coach. VEF Riga started by competing in the Latvian League and the Baltic League second division. VEF Riga was made up of young and talented players, so the team improved gradually. It all paid off right away, as VEF Riga made it to the Baltic League second division title game in 2008 and 2009, earning the right to join the first division in 2009-10.

In the same season, VEF returned to European competitions as it played in FIBA Euro Challenge. Also, VEF Rīga took part in VTB United League's inaugural regular season. In 2010, led by Alex Renfroe and Sandis Valters, VEF Riga reached the Latvian League finals for the first time, losing 3-4 to Barons Riga. In the 2010 off-season, VEF Riga made another step forward as they got a chance to play in Eurocup. VEF Riga named Rimas Kurtinaitis as the head coach and made some key roster moves like re-signing Sandis Valters along with acquisitions of other top Latvian players such as Kristaps Janičenoks, Kaspars Bērziņš and Dairis Bertāns.

During the season, Kurtinaitis left Riga for Russian powerhouse BC Khimki and he was replaced by another Lithuanian Ramūnas Butautas, who already had experience in Latvia, having won the 2007 Latvian league championship with ASK Rīga. VEF Riga finished the season as the winners of BBL regular season. Later in BBL play-off stage VEF Riga caused a surprise by eliminating the Lithuanian club Lietuvos Rytas at the BBL semi-finals, beating them 79:68. It was the first time that one of the BBL finalists wasn't Lietuvos Rytas. However, VEF Rīga lost in the final to Lithuanian basketball club Žalgiris, with a final score of 69:75. In the Latvian League, VEF Rīga returned to the finals, where they faced BK Ventspils. During the intense series, VEF Rīga managed to beat Ventspils, 4-3, winning first Latvian championship.

Rise under Butautas
Before the 2011-2012 season, VEF Rīga participated in the Euroleague qualification round round for the first time, where they lost to ALBA Berlin. It meant VEF Rīga had to play in Eurocup, where they reached the Last 16 round for the first time. In Baltic League, they finished in third place, while in the Latvian league VEF Rīga repeated as champions defeating Ventspils, in the finals, 4-1. 

During the following off-season, VEF Rīga got lucky by getting E.J. Rowland, who was loaned from Unicaja Málaga with favorable conditions. Rowland turned out to be a massive part of upcoming success. Rowland, surrounded by a strong core consisting of Latvian players, helped VEF Rīga get wins over well-established teams. The culmination of the season was on 15 January 2013 when VEF Rīga trashed Bilbao Basket at Arēna Rīga, 99-76. In the VTB United League, VEF Rīga stopped after Quarterfinals, but in Latvian League, they won the third consecutive title against Ventspils (4-1).

After a very good season, VEF Rīga lost its top players as Bilbao bought out Dairis Bertāns, and E.J. Rowland signed a lucrative contract in Turkey, followed by other departures. The season wasn't as good as the previous one. One of the reasons was the inconsistent lineup. One of the biggest signings of the summer, Gani Lawal, left the team in the preseason. VEF Rīga had a first-round exit in the Euroleague qualification round which was followed by not making the second round in the Eurocup. In the end, affected by injuries and some unexpected events like Derrick Nix leaving the team on the eve of the Latvian League finals, after three years of dominance VEF Rīga lost the domestic championship, losing to Ventspils, 1-4.

In the 2014 off-season, VEF Riga went through rebuilding as several new faces (Jānis Timma, Mareks Mejeris) joined the team. VEF struggled in international tournaments and failed to make the playoffs, but finished the season by the winning Latvian championship. After the departure of Nikolajs Mazurs, VEF hired Carlos Frade as the next head coach. The Spanish coach tried to change the philosophy of the basketball VEF played under previous coaches, but it didn't turn out well, and on 12 December 2015, VEF fired Frade. Long-time assistant Jānis Gailītis was promoted as a head coach and took the team to the Latvian League finals, but lost to Valmiera/Ordo.

Gailītis continued as head coach. The following season VEF signed Latvian National Team captain Jānis Blūms and another veteran Armands Šķēle. They helped to regain the Latvian championship, and VEF returned to the VTB League quarterfinals for the first time in four years.

Following the 2016-17 season, Blums and Skele veterans left the team, but VEF signed another two experienced players: Kristaps Janičenoks and Kaspars Bērziņš. Alex Pérez was also signed, giving him his first experience in European basketball. The team again qualified for the VTB League quarterfinals but failed to win the Latvian championship.

Leaving VTB League and joining Champions League
In 2018-19 season VEF joined newly created Latvian-Estonian Basketball League. They lost in the final to biggest rivals Ventspils, but revenged in Latvian League finals, winning Latvian championship for the 6th time. It was Janičenoks' last season in his professional career. Mareks Mejeris had become a star player of the team, and VEF wasn't able to keep him in the 2019 off-season. Mejeris signed with Parma Basket. Team's budget became smaller and the management decided to leave VTB United League. Instead, VEF returned to international competition stage, joining Basketball Champions League, organized by FIBA.

In 2019 off-season VEF signed back veteran Jānis Blūms and promising Latvian talent Artūrs Kurucs, loaned by Spanish Euroleague team Saski Baskonia. Kurucs used the opportunity, becoming one of the best young players in Basketball Champions League. Debut in Champions League was rough, VEF won only one of 14 games in regular season and was dead last in the standings. End of the season was interrupted by COVID-19 pandemic. VEF was awarded Latvian championship, so they could get back to Champions League the following season.

Second participation in the Basketball Champions League was way better, as VEF qualified for the playoffs round, and also won the Latvian championship. However, team again failed to win the 2020–21 Latvian–Estonian Basketball League, losing to Estonian Kalev/Cramo in the final. Many players used the platform to rise their name and got better contracts for the next season: Kyle Allman signed with Paris Basketball, Michale Kyser signed with Hapoel Holon, Isaiah Piñeiro signed with Darüşşafaka. Kristers Zoriks became a Latvian NT starter.

On 7 March 2022 VEF won the Latvian Cup for the first time ever. It was first Latvian Cup organized since 1994. Alexander Madsen was named the Latvian Cup MVP.

Honours

League
Latvian League: 
Winners (9): 2011, 2012, 2013, 2015, 2017, 2019, 2020, 2021, 2022
Runners-up (4): 2010, 2014, 2016, 2018
Latvian Cup: 
Winners (2): 2022, 2023
Baltic League
Winners (0): 
Runners-up (1): 2011
Bronze (1): 2012
BBL Cup
Winners (1): 2011
Latvian–Estonian League
Winners (1): 2022
Runners-up (1): 2019, 2021
USSR Championship
Winners (0): 
Runners-up (0): 
Bronze (3): 1960, 1966, 1991

Other competitions
Atgāzene, Latvia Invitational Game
Winners (1): 2010

Season by season record

Players

Current roster

Depth chart

Squad changes for the 2022–23 season

In

Out

FIBA Hall of Famers

Notable former players

 Artis Ate
 Ainars Bagatskis
 Dairis Bertāns
 Artūrs Bērziņš
 Jānis Bērziņš
 Kaspars Bērziņš
 Jānis Blūms
 Rolands Freimanis 
 Raitis Grafs
 Andrejs Gražulis
 Māris Gulbis
 Gatis Jahovičs
 Ingus Jakovičs
 Kristaps Janičenoks
 Edgars Jeromanovs
 Verners Kohs
 Jānis Krūmiņš 
 Rihards Kuksiks
 Artūrs Kurucs
 Rodions Kurucs
 Mārtiņš Laksa
 Andris Misters
 Mārtiņš Meiers
 Mareks Mejeris
 Igors Miglinieks
 Raimonds Miglinieks
 Kārlis Muižnieks
 Cēzars Ozers
 Anžejs Pasečņiks
 Žanis Peiners
 Artūrs Strēlnieks
 Aigars Šķēle
 Armands Šķēle
 Andrejs Šeļakovs 
 Jānis Timma
 Maigonis Valdmanis 
 Sandis Valters
 Valdis Valters
 Kaspars Vecvagars
 Gundars Vētra
 Ričmonds Vilde
 Ronalds Zaķis
 Jamar Abrams
 Andrew Andrews
 Kyle Allman
 Glenn Cosey
 Josh Bostic
 Dee Brown
 Da'Sean Butler
 Tyler Cain
 Paul Carter
 Justin Cobbs
 Vincent Council
 Ron Curry
 Will Daniels
 Kevin Dillard
 Abdul Gaddy 
 Josh Harrellson 
 Justin Hamilton 
 C. J. Harris
 Baden Jaxen 
 Speedy Smith 
 Trevon Hughes
 Michale Kyser
 Robert Lowery
 Austin Luke
 Quinn McDowell
 Lester Medford
 Anthony Miles
 Curtis Millage 
 Keaton Nankivil
 Derrick Nix
 Marque Perry
 Alex Renfroe
 Antywane Robinson
 Gerald Robinson
 LaQuinton Ross
 E. J. Rowland
 Patrick Sanders
 Courtney Sims
 Stephen Zack
 Devondrick Walker
 Xavier Thames
 Kristijan Krajina
 Artsiom Parakhouski 
 Kenan Bajramović
 Siim-Sander Vene
 Antanas Kavaliauskas 
 Arnas Labuckas
 Martynas Mažeika 
 Donatas Zavackas
 Tomas Delininkaitis
 Bojan Bakić
 Gani Lawal 
 Nemanja Bezbradica 
 Evgeny Kolesnikov
 Bamba Fall
 Ludvig Håkanson
 Francisco Cruz
 Alex Perez
 Guille Rubio
 Kris Richard
 Isaiah Piñeiro

Coaches

Notable former coaches

 Alfrēds Krauklis 
 Alvils Gulbis
 Armands Krauliņš
 Maigonis Valdmanis
 Valdis Valters
 Rimas Kurtinaitis 
 Ramūnas Butautas
 Nikolajs Mazurs
 Carlos Frade
 Jānis Gailītis

References

External links
 Official VEF Rīga Site 
 VEF Rīga VTB-League.com 
 VEF Rīga LBL.lv 
 VEF Rīga BBL.net
 VEF Rīga EuroCupBasketball.com

1958 establishments in the Soviet Union
1992 disestablishments in Latvia
2007 establishments in Latvia
Basketball teams established in 1958
Basketball teams established in 2007
Basketball teams in Latvia
Basketball teams in the Soviet Union
Sport in Riga
Sports clubs disestablished in 1992